The Spirits Up Above is an album by trombonist Steve Turre recorded in 2004 and released on the HighNote label.

Reception

The AllMusic review by Scott Yanow said "Trombonist Steve Turre pays tribute to his former employer, the remarkable multi-reedist Rahsaan Roland Kirk, on this sincere effort. Turre and an all-star group perform nine of Kirk's songs plus the trombonist's "One for Kirk." But although the music is certainly well played, one misses Rahsaan's miraculous innovations ... the craziness and wide-ranging approach of Rahsaan's performances are missing on this rather conventional effort".

On All About Jazz, John Kelman observed "Turre is in a unique position to re-evaluate the music and performances of Kirk, and deliver up The Spirits Up Above, as honest and heartfelt an homage as is possible ... The best music is meant to be a true symbiosis, and The Spirits Up Above goes a long way to breaking down any invisible barriers between those who play and those who listen".

In JazzTimes, Harvey Siders stated "It’s easy to imagine what Kirk found so attractive in Turre’s nascent technique; it must have appealed to Kirk’s desire to spread his personal gospel of “listen to and play all genres.” Ditto for the other players on the disc, particularly Carter, a monster on tenor".

The Penguin Guide to Jazz Recordings describes the album as a “delightful tribute to Rahsaan Roland Kirk, with some clever reinventions of themes which have rarely been handled by anyone else.”

Track listing 
All compositions by Rahsaan Roland Kirk except where noted
 "Three for the Festival" – 3:02
 "One for Kirk" (Steve Turre) – 5:03
 "Medley: Serenade to a Cuckoo/Bright Moments" – 9:22
 "Stepping Into Beauty" – 4:43
 "The Spirits Up Above" – 4:37
 "Hand Full of Five" – 4:48
 "E.D." – 4:14
 "Dorthaan's Walk" – 5:58
 "Volunteered Slavery" – 8:33

Personnel 
Steve Turre – trombone
James Carter - tenor saxophone, flute 
Vincent Herring – alto saxophone, soprano saxophone 
Dave Valentin – flute (track 3)
Mulgrew Miller – piano
Buster Williams - bass
Winard Harper – drums
Andromeda Turre, Akua Dixon, Michael Hill, Whitney Marchell Jackson, Joe Dixon, Steve Turre – chorus (tracks 5 & 9)

References 

Steve Turre albums
2004 albums
HighNote Records albums
Albums recorded at Van Gelder Studio